West Acton is a place in West London, England. It is part of Acton, in the London Borough of Ealing.

Neighbouring places
 Park Royal
 Acton
 Ealing
 Shepherd's Bush

Transport

West Acton Station (Central line)

Areas of London
Districts of the London Borough of Ealing
Acton, London